David H. Rosenthal (1945–1992) was an American author, poet, editor, and translator. He wrote mostly on the history of jazz music and was also an important translator of Catalan literature. Among his translations was the first English rendering of the Catalan epic "Tirant Lo Blanch," of which Cervantes said, "I swear to you, my friend, it's the best book of its kind in the world."

Selected books
 Eyes on the Street (1974)
 Modern Catalan Poetry (editor, 1979)
 Loves of the Poets: Poems (1989)
 Hard Bop: Jazz and Black Music 1955–1965 (1992)
 The Journey: Poems (1992)
 Four Postwar Catalan Poets (editor, 1994)

References

External links
Catalan Biography
 David H. Rosenthal legacy
 New York Times obituary 

American book editors
American writers about music
Catalan–English translators
Spanish–English translators
Portuguese–English translators
1945 births
1992 deaths
20th-century American poets
20th-century translators
20th-century American non-fiction writers